Superman is a 1948 15-part Columbia Pictures film serial based on the comic book character Superman. It stars an uncredited Kirk Alyn (billed on-screen only by his character's name, Superman; but credited as Kirk Alyn on the promotional posters) and Noel Neill as Lois Lane. Like Batman (1943), it is notable as the first live-action appearance of Superman on film, and for the longevity of its distribution. The serial was directed by Thomas Carr, who later directed many early episodes of the Adventures of Superman television series, and Spencer Gordon Bennet, produced by Sam Katzman, and shot in and around Los Angeles, California. It was originally screened at movie matinées, and after the first three scene-setting chapters, every episode ends in a cliffhanger. The Superman-in-flight scenes are animations, in part due to the small production budget.

It was a "tremendous financial success" and played in "first-run theatres that had never before booked a serial". The serial was a popular success that made Kirk Alyn famous and launched Noel Neill's career. A sequel serial, Atom Man vs. Superman, also directed by Bennet, was released in 1950.

Plot
Superman is sent to Earth by his parents just as the planet Krypton blows up and is later raised as Clark Kent by a farm couple. They discover that he has great powers so they send him off to use his powers to help those in need. After his foster parents die, the Man of Steel heads to Metropolis under the bespectacled guise of Kent and joins the staff of the Daily Planet in order to be close to the news. Soon after he is sent out to get the scoop on a new rock that a man has found that he calls Kryptonite, and Clark passes out; then and there Superman discovers that his weakness is Kryptonite. Whenever emergencies happen, he responds in his true identity as Superman. This first serial revolves around the nefarious plot of a villain who calls herself the Spider Lady.

Cast

 Kirk Alyn as Kal-El / Clark Kent / Superman
 Mason Alan Dinehart as young Clark Kent
 Noel Neill as Lois Lane
 Pierre Watkin as Perry White
 Tommy Bond as Jimmy Olsen
 Carol Forman as Spider Lady
 Herbert Rawlinson as Dr. Graham
 Forrest Taylor as Professor Arnold Leeds
 Nelson Leigh as Jor-El
 Luana Walters as Lara
 Edward Cassidy as Eben Kent
 Virginia Carroll as Martha Kent

Alyn, Neill, Watkin, and Bond reprised their roles in the 1950 sequel, Atom Man vs. Superman.

Noel Neill would return to the role of Lois Lane in 1953, replacing Phyllis Coates in the second through final (sixth) seasons of The Adventures of Superman, and would be the model for Metropolis, Illinois' 2010 Lois Lane statue.

Production

Republic Pictures tried twice to produce a Superman serial. The first attempt was replaced by Mysterious Doctor Satan (1940), when licensing negotiations with Superman publisher National Comics (later called DC Comics) failed. A second attempt was advertised for a 1941 release; but this time, two obstacles doomed production. National Comics insisted on absolute control of the script and production, and the rights to Superman were already committed to the Paramount cartoon series. Sam Katzman acquired the live-action rights in 1947. He tried to sell them to Universal, but they no longer made serials by then. He also tried to sell to Republic, but they claimed that "a superpowerful flying hero would be impossible to adapt"—despite having already successfully done just that with Adventures of Captain Marvel in 1941. Also, Republic was no longer buying properties for adaptation by 1947. Columbia accepted the offer.

Sam Katzman found Kirk Alyn after looking through photographs, but had a hard time selling the idea of casting Alyn to Whitney Ellsworth, National Comics' representative on the project. This was made even worse when Alyn came in for a screen test, sporting a goatee and moustache (as he was also shooting another project, a historical film). These initial reservations were eventually overcome, and Alyn got the part. Columbia's advertising claimed that it could not get an actor to fill the role, so it had "hired Superman himself", and Kirk Alyn was merely playing Clark Kent.

George Plympton added a joke to script, substituting the Lone Ranger's "Hi-Yo Silver!" for the traditional "Up, up, and away". This did not survive in the script long enough to actually be filmed. The Superman costume was grey and brown, instead of blue and red, because those colors photographed better on black and white film. It was never explained why his costume is shown as red and green on the one-sheet posters.

Episode 1, "Superman Comes to Earth", features a line delivered by Edward Cassidy (as Eben Kent) to Kirk Alyn (as foster son Clark Kent): "Because of these great powers - your speed and strength, your x-ray vision and super-sensitive hearing - you have a great responsibility". Fourteen years later, Stan Lee's Amazing Fantasy #15 introduced Spider-Man and popularized the motto, "With great power comes great responsibility".

Special effects
Superman's flight sequences were animated instead of live-action or model work. Harmon and Glut consider this to be the "weakest point of the serial", explaining that the "effects created by Republic for Captain Marvel were very convincing, even the more routine ones for the Superman TV series, always showing the same pose, were better". While there were other effective special effects, in their opinion, they were undermined by the poorness of the flying sequences. The film crew did test an alternative method of filming the flying sequences: Kirk Alyn spent an entire day painfully suspended by visible wires in front of a rear projection of moving clouds. Displeased with the results, Katzman fired the entire flight sequence production staff, and used the animated method instead.

A peculiar characteristic of the mix of animated and live-action footage is that Superman's take-offs are almost always visible in the foreground, while his landings almost always occur behind objects, such as parked cars, rocks, and buildings. It was easier to shift from live footage of Kirk Alyn starting to take off, to animated footage, than it was to shift from an animated landing to live footage of the actor. As a consequence of the need to hide Superman's landings, Superman frequently lands at some distance from where he wants to be, and must run to arrive on-scene.

Budget limitations also dictated the frequent re-use of film footage, especially scenes of Superman flying. For example, one sequence showing Superman flying over a rocky hill (shot in the hills of Chatsworth in Southern California's San Fernando Valley) was used at least once in almost every episode of the first serial.

Stunts
Alyn's stunt double was Paul Stader. He had to perform only one stunt in the entire serial, leaping from the back of a truck. He almost broke his leg during this stunt, and had to leave the production.

Home media
The Superman serial was first made available for purchase on VHS videotape in 1987 as a double tape box set. The serial was also offered available in two separate VHS tapes as "Volume 1" (Chapters 1 to 7) and "Volume 2" (Chapters 8 to 15).

It was officially released on DVD by Warner Home Video, along with its sequel Atom Man vs. Superman, on November 28, 2006 as Superman: The Theatrical Serials Collection. Warner released the serials rather than Columbia, as Warner's subsidiary DC Comics acquired the rights to the serials several years beforehand. With the previous 2006 DVD release out of print for a few years, the serials were re-released as manufactured-on-demand (MOD) DVD from Warner Archive Collection on October 9, 2018.

Chapter titles
 Superman Comes To Earth
 Depths Of The Earth
 The Reducer Ray
 Man Of Steel
 A Job For Superman
 Superman In Danger
 Into The Electric Furnace
 Superman To The Rescue
 Irresistible Force
 Between Two Fires
 Superman's Dilemma
 Blast In The Depths
 Hurled To Destruction
 Superman At Bay
 The Payoff
Source:

References

Sources
 Look, Up in the Sky: The Amazing Story of Superman

External links
 
 
 

1948 films

Superman films
Live-action films based on DC Comics

Films about journalists

Columbia Pictures film serials

American black-and-white films
Films directed by Spencer Gordon Bennet
American science fiction films
1940s science fiction films
1940s superhero films
American films with live action and animation
1940s English-language films
Films with screenplays by George H. Plympton
Films with screenplays by Joseph F. Poland
1940s American films
Films based on DC Comics